Hilda Clark (12 January 1881 – 24 February 1955) was a British physician and humanitarian infrastructure creator worker. In August 1914, she was the instigator of what became a Quaker relief infrastructure across Europe and through Russia, the Friends War Victims Relief Committee, which may have been the infrastructure across Europe that made the Kindertransport possible. That and memories of even the worst Nazis of mothers who told them that after WW1, "Only the Quakers would feed us." Hilda Clark was the bedrock and cornerstone of this infrastructure.

Life Summary
Her own WW1 relief work was with her life-long friend Edith Pye, a nurse and midwife, together they founded and ran a maternity hospital at Chalons-sur-Marne from 1914-18. By July 1919 Hilda was in Vienna, to witness the devastation and famine setting up a Quaker Help Mission at #16 Singerstrasse, she was joined by Edith Pye and then a Bertha Bracey in 1921. Bertha Bracey was to become extremely significant subsequently in the Kindertransport. By 1923, Vienna was on its feet and both women became engaged in various relief efforts with Hilda criss-crossing Europe and passing through the Quaker Help Mission in Vienna. As the Nazi regime took on momentum and Austria was  annexed to the Third Reich in the Anschluss (12 March 1938) Hilda became the Co-ordinator of the German Emergency Committee and returned to Vienna to use her expertise and connections, in generating documentations and placements and qualifications for Jewish people to aid their escape.

Early life
Clark was born 12 January 1881 at Green Bank, Street, Somerset and was the youngest child of the Quaker shoe manufacturer William Stephens Clark and the social reformer Helen Priestman Bright Clark. The Clark family of Street were Quakers of shoe-making fame as C. and J. Clark Ltd. Manufacturer of boots, shoes & sheepskin rugs.

As a child, she was involved in athletics and gymnastics. She had a Quaker education at Brighthelmston, at Birkdale in Southport, Lancashire, about 1896–7, and The Mount, in York, from about 1897 to 1900, before studying medicine at Birmingham University and the Royal Free Hospital, London where she graduated M.B. and B.S. in 1908. She was the sister of Alice Clark, the feminist and historian and the niece of Annie Clark, one the first pioneering women to formally train in medicine in Britain. Her mother and great-aunts helped to found a number of women's rights organizations in the 1860s. She developed expertise in pulmonary care treating her own sister Alice Clark for TB. During her medical training in Birmingham, she met Edith Pye in 1907-8 where Edith Pye qualified as a nurse and a midwife. This was to become a life-long friendship, which sustained them both.  Hilda's side of the correspondence between them survives, carefully curated by Edith Pye and these letters form the basis of the book "War and its Aftermath" published in 1956.  This account is written by a Quaker who has read one side of the original correspondence that survives, the letters from Hilda Clark to Edith Pye, all lovingly preserved and organised and archived in Quaker Archives in London.  It is clear that Edith Pye kept the whole of her side of the correspondence, which runs from 1908 when they met to the outbreak of WWII, when they could only return to England.

Medicine
Clark specialised in the treatment of pulmonary tuberculosis. She was instrumental in administering the TB vaccine, tuberculin, developed by Dr W. Camac-Wilkinson. She opened and ran two tuberculin dispensaries, the first at her home town of Street in Somerset, the second, by appointment as Medical Officer of the Portsmouth Municipal Tuberculin Dispensary in 1911.

In 1910 she successfully treated her sister, Alice Clark, a suffragist who was suffering from tuberculosis. Clark gave a paper on "Tuberculosis Statistics: Some Difficulties in the Presentation of Facts bearing on the Tuberculosis Problem in a Suitable Form for Statistical Purposes", later published in Proceedings of the Royal Society of Medicine, 1914. Alice Clark was a vital element of the Relief work based in England ensuring the supplies identified by her sister were organised and sent out.

World War 1: Friends War Victims Relief Committee - Establishment of a Relief Infrastructure Across Europe & Into Russia
In August 1914, Hilda Clark was the driving force behind creating the Friends War Victims Relief Committee with Edmund Harvey another Quaker from Leeds. Hilda understood even before the guns were in place that i) the war would not "be over by Christmas" and ii) that as never before civilians would be affected and displaced. This initiative turned into a Quaker infrastructure that spread across Europe and across Russia.
At the end of the war, Hilda and Edith were both exhausted but by July 1919 Hilda had set out for the humanitarian catastrophe that was unfolding in Vienna. She was allocated accommodation and created the kwakerhilfesmission (Quaker Help Mission) at Singerstrasse #16, which became a hub from which not only relief but also initiatives designed to get people back on their own feet. It was to Singerstrasse #16 she returned as Coordinator of the German Emergency Committee to use her accumulated expertise and contacts in Vienna, to create the documentation required by other countries so that Jewish people could escape.

1914-1918 Maternity Hospital at Chalons-sur-Marne, France
For World War 1, the midwifery expertise of Edith Pye was needed and they went together to the maternity hospital at Chalons, close enough to the western front, to hear the boom of the cannons and from time to time to need to evacuate mothers and babes in arms into the cellars. Hilda was a doctor which informed her organisational and logistic abilities in identifying what was needed and working out how to get it there. There is one harrowing account of a 13-year-old girl, casualty not of the enemy but of drunken soldiers who had raped her, who the whole community of the hospital, mothers and medical staff cared for such that by the time the child was born the young woman was able to take it home.

There is a letter from Hilda Clark to Edith Pye, taking great delight in the legion d'honneur awarded to Edith Pye, as she commented "for once it has gone to the right person". The legion d'honneur is located in the archive of the Royal College of Obstetrics & Gynaecology, of which Edith Pye was the President from 1929-49. Her nursing and midwifery certificates are also located there. In the 1940s she was awarded an OBE for her services to midwifery. Edith Pye became a Quaker by convincement, whereas Hilda Clark was a "birthright" Friend and of very historic Quaker stock, but this has tended to mean that she has been given the credit for the work of Edith Pye, and distorted the historical memory with a room named for Hilda Clark at Friends House (London) but not one for Edith Pye who was at least as deserving of recognition. Alice Clark was also a mainstay from England and was an essential part of ensuring the relevant supplies arrived from England.

1919-1923 Vienna - "A Dying City"
After World War I, they returned to England exhausted after their work at the maternity hospital in Chalons-sur-Marne but in 1919, a letter arrived from General Smuts in Vienna, telling them of the catastrophic conditions in the imperial capital of a collapsing empire. General Smuts knew the Clark family through Margaret, an elder sister of Hilda (and Alice) because Margaret Clark has gone to South Africa after the Boer War to organise war relief. General Smuts found himself part of the British occupying forces. It was he who ordered that Allied servicemen should have no greater rations than the Viennese had access to.  Vienna became a magnet for all the ethnic "Germans" from all parts of the vast Austrian Empire both bureaucrats and veterans and their families from across the former empire with no homes to return to, in newly independent countries happy to be free of the Austro-Hungarian empire, they all converged on Vienna in a truncated and defeated Austria, prostrate with economic sanctions of the victorious Allies. By the middle of July Hilda Clark was in Paris (with a hat box) working out how to get to Vienna, the only way was via Trieste. By the end of July Hilda wrote to Edith Pye with hand-written letter heading Quaker Help Mission 16 Singerstrasse, District 1 Vienna, in accommodation in the centre of Vienna allocated by the authorities, a building with an extremely ornate frontage. Hilda was to write of the wretchedness of having to eat, while hearing those outside with nothing to eat and described it as worse that the shelling at the western front. The next letter was dated 6 weeks later in September 1919. It was the same address but in German and in the German style and printed and even included a phone number.
Clark reported in 1919 on behalf of the Save the Children Fund about the dire condition of children's health in Austria during that country's famine years and proposed cheap dietary solutions to rectify the deficiencies.

She organised a scheme to buy cows from the Netherlands and Switzerland and fodder from Croatia and Czechoslovakia in order to produce much needed milk for children.

During a visit to Hungary with Dr Hector Munro and Mr Buxton in August 1919, they sent a telegram to the Under-Secretary of Foreign Affairs in London, seeking urgent medical supplies for the hospitals of Budapest.

Quaker feeding programmes in postwar Germany and Austria

1923-1937 Humanitarian Activism
During the 1920s Hilda was an active member of a number of various Women's organisations including the League of Nations, the Women's Peace Crusade (of which she was secretary), the Women's International League for Peace and Freedom, the International Commission for the Assistance of Child Refugees as well as Quaker campaigns such as the Friends' Service Council. She was also an early supporter of the British Society for the Study of Sex Psychology, an organisation concerned with gay rights and acceptance. She also became a noted speaker about international affairs on behalf of the League of Nations and other international bodies. Clark was Chairman of the Anti-Opium Committee of the Women's International League which advocated state control of 'dangerous drugs'.

1938 Anschluss: Return to Vienna - the Vanishing Window before the Outbreak of WW2
As the Nazi regime took on momentum and Austria was  annexed to the Third Reich in the Anschluss (12 March 1938) Hilda returned to Vienna, in her role as Honorary Secretary, to use her expertise and connections, in generating documentations and placements and qualifications for Jewish people to aid their escape. "Only those most closely concerned can know what the work owed at this stage of rapid expansion to the steady faith and practical experience on Hilda Clark." Sources vary: "According to J Ormorod Greenwood, "between March 1938 and the outbreak of war, the office of the old Baroque palace in Singerstrasse #16 handled 11,000 applications affecting 15,000 people, prepared detailed case papers for 8,000 families and single persons, and got 4,500 individuals away to many countries each of which had its (own) different immigration procedures." "According to meticulous statistics that survive 6,000 cases, representing 13,745 persons, were registered between 15 March 1938 and 28 Aug 1939 and 2,408 of this total were ultimately able to leave. They included 509 women, 1,588 men and 311 dependants, the largest number, 1,264 going to 'England', 165 to the United States, and 107 to Australia (Schmitt HA (1997) Quakers & Nazis Columbia/London: University of Michigan Press p163)  suggests the "discrepancies are probably largely due to the fact that Greenwood's figures include the children who travelled to England on the Kindertransport". By the outbreak of World War II Hilda had returned safely to England.

Later life and death
Her home in London was bombed in 1940 and she moved to Kent, where she was active in the Soldiers, Sailors and Airmens Families Association. She became disabled as a result of Parkinson's disease and returned to Street in 1952, where she died at her home on 24 February 1955 and was buried at the Street Quaker burial ground. Edith Pye continued to live in Street after Hilda's death and herself died in 1965, she was buried under the same headstone.

The Hilda Clark room at Friends House, London, UK is named after her.

Publications 
 The Dispensary Treatment of Pulmonary Tuberculosis. London, Bailliere & Co. 1915
 Pye, Edith Mary (ed) War and its Aftermath. Letters from Hilda Clark from France, Austria and the Near East 1914-1924. London, Friends Book House, 1956
 The Armaments Industry: a study of the report of the Royal Commission on the Manufacture of and Trade in Arms and Munitions of War and of the Evidence published in the Minutes of the Commission during 1936. London, Women’s Peace Crusade 1937

References 

 Bailey, Brenda A Quaker Couple in Germany York: Sessions 1994
 Clark, Hilda 1908-1940 Original Correspondence (Quaker Archives)
 Holmes, Rose (2015) 1933-39 A moral business: British Quaker work with refugees from fascism. Doctoral thesis (PhD), University of Sussex.
 Pye, Edith Mary (ed) War and its Aftermath. Letters from Hilda Clark from France, Austria and the Near East 1914-1924. London, Friends Book House, 1956
 Spilelhofer Shiela 1919-1942 Stemming the Dark Tide: Quakers in Vienna, William Sessions Limited, 2001 

1881 births
1955 deaths
People from Street, Somerset
Alumni of the University of Birmingham
English women medical doctors
English humanitarians
Women humanitarians
English Quakers
Tuberculosis researchers
British pulmonologists
Alumni of the UCL Medical School
20th-century English women writers
20th-century English writers